Contact is a remix album by Fantastic Plastic Machine, released roughly nine months after beautiful.. Tanaka enlisted the assistance of several musicians for the project, including Rip Slyme, Kahimi Karie and King Britt. Tanaka also remixed several tracks on the album himself as well as contributing one new song, "City Lights".

The scheduled release date of September 12, 2001, was postponed due of the September 11, 2001 attacks. It was then pushed back to October 16, 2001.

Track listing 
 "City Lights"
 "Beautiful Days" [Taku's Garage Mix]
 "Whistle Song" [Sunaga'T Experience Mix]
 "God Save the Mona Lisa" (Performed by Roberto Menescal & Carlos Lyra)
 "Paragon2"
 "Black Dada" [Rip Slyme Mix]
 "Love is Psychedelic" [Full Spoken Mix]
 "I'm Still a Simple Man" (Performed by Hirth Martinez)
 "Todos Os Desejos" [King Britt's Scuba Mix]
 "Subete o Yurashite (On a Chair)"
 "Whistle Song" [Grant Nelson Club Mix]
 "Beautiful Days" [Female Vocal Mix]

Fantastic Plastic Machine (musician) albums
2001 remix albums